When the American Brass Quintet gave its first public performance on December 11, 1960, brass chamber music was still relatively young to concert audiences. The New York Brass Quintet is regarded as the first brass quintet in the United States, having formed in 1954. Other groups soon followed like the Chicago Brass Quintet, formed in 1963. To delineate itself from these other two groundbreaking ensembles American Brass Quintet dedicated itself to "music originally written for brass," and substituted a bass trombone for the conventional tuba voice. That debut concert for them in 1960 marked the beginning of an international career for the ensemble that includes performances in Europe, Central and South America, the Middle East, Asia, Australia and all fifty of the United States; a discography now numbering fifty-one recordings; the premieres of over one hundred new brass works, and the inspiration to a whole new generation of brass quintets worldwide. ABQ commissions by Samuel Adler, Bruce Adolphe, Daniel Asia, Jan Bach, Robert Beaser, William Bolcom, Elliott Carter, Billy Childs, Robert Dennis, Jacob Druckman, Eric Ewazen, Anthony Plog, Huang Ruo, David Sampson, Gunther Schuller, William Schuman, Ralph Shapey, Joan Tower, Melinda Wagner, and Charles Whittenberg are considered among the most significant contributions to the brass quintet repertoire. In the past fifteen years alone, the ABQ has released recordings of over twenty-five major new brass quintets. The presentation of challenging contemporary brass music alongside earlier eras carefully edited by ABQ members for modern performance, has become a trademark of ABQ programming, and has helped establish the American Brass Quintet as the leader in the field of serious brass chamber music today.

Equally committed to the promotion of its brand of brass music through education, the American Brass Quintet has been in residence at The Juilliard School since 1987 and at the Aspen Music Festival since 1970. The ABQ has established residencies at many music departments throughout the US, including the University at Buffalo in 2008. Many young ensembles, including the Extension Ensemble, Manhattan Brass Quintet, Meridian Arts Ensemble, and Urban Brass Quintet have worked with the ABQ through these residencies, and have gone on to establish their own presence in the brass chamber music field. Since 2001 the ABQ has offered its expertise in chamber music performance and training with a program of mini-residencies as part of its regular touring season. Designed to offer young groups and individuals an intense chamber music experience over several days, ABQ mini-residencies have been embraced by many schools and communities.
	
Through its acclaimed performances, signature programming, large discography, and educational endeavors, the ABQ has created a formidable legacy in the brass field. Hailed as "the high priests of brass" by Newsweek, "positively breathtaking", by The New York Times, and "of all the brass quintets, this country's most distinguished" by the American Record Guide, the American Brass Quintet has clearly defined itself among the elite chamber music ensembles of our time. The American Brass Quintet is the 2013 recipient of Chamber Music America's highest honor, the Richard J. Bogomolny National Service Award for significant and lasting contributions to the field.

The current ABQ consists of Louis Hanzlik and Kevin Cobb on trumpet, Eric Reed on French horn, Michael Powell on tenor trombone, and John Rojak on bass trombone.

See also 
 Canadian Brass
 Brass Quintet Repertoire
 brass instrument

References

External links 
American Brass Quintet
Art of the States: American Brass Quintet
Classical Archives Interview

Musical groups established in 1960
Brass quintets
Juilliard School faculty
American brass bands
Summit Records artists
1960 establishments in the United States